is a 2017 fighting game developed and published by Nintendo for the Nintendo Switch. The game differentiates itself from standard fighting games with its unconventional fighting system where every playable character fights with long range attacks and up to four players can choose a fighter and battle using a variety of extendable, weaponized arms to knock out opponents in a three-dimensional arena. Arms received generally favorable reviews from critics and sold over two million copies as of July 2018, making it one of the best-selling games on the Switch.

Gameplay

Arms is a 3D fighting sports game in which up to four players can control one of a variety of fighters, with the player able to perform basic fighting actions using extendable arms such as punching, throwing, blocking and dodging. Arms features fifteen playable fighters, including Min Min and Twintelle, with five of them being released as downloadable content. Each fighter starts with three unique Arms that can be selected in battle, but the use of all other fighters' Arms can be unlocked in the Get Arms mode. All fighters also have unique attributes in combat. When the attack meter is fully charged, players are able to unleash a high-damage "rush attack" against their opponents. Players can also charge their attacks to temporarily increase damage and utilize elemental effects. Each character has a different set of abilities and unique Arms for different strategies. Players are able to use the system's Joy-Con motion controls or standard button inputs with controllers such as the Pro Controller to operate each Arm individually. Players are also able to customize their Arm load outs, with each Arm being able to be selected independently. Every Arm is different with elemental attributes and varying weights that affect gameplay. Up to four players are able to play in a single match, either in a three or four-way free-for-all, or in a two-on-two mode in which teammates are tethered together.

Besides the standard fighting mode, Arms features multiple other modes: Versus, Grand Prix, and a variety of Battle modes. In Grand Prix, players take on a set of 10 matches against computer-controlled fighters to win the championship belt. Battle mode consists of volleyball and basketball modes, a target breaking mode, and a survival mode. Players can also play online in a party match lobby with up to 20 players, or in one-on-one ranked matches. Arms featured ten playable fighters at launch, with five additional fighters added via post-release updates.

Development
The game was developed by Nintendo's Entertainment Planning & Development division, produced by Kosuke Yabuki. In the beginning, the game began as a wish to see if a behind-the-camera perspective could work in a fighting game. To make this idea work, the main feature of extendable arms was implemented, with Yabuki stating "Let's talk about a game I know about very well - Mario Kart. Something appears in the distance and you steer in relation to that - that's the basic structure of the game," in reference to Mario Kart and how its gameplay helped influence Arms.

Early on, the idea of featuring staple Nintendo characters such as Link and Mario was considered. However, the aesthetic of the game, especially with the concept of extendable arms, clashed with them, and it was eventually decided that a new cast of characters be created. The possibility of adding characters from Punch-Out!! was also considered but the team was concerned about alienating fans of that franchise and potentially confusing new players.

Character designs started with the arms first with the team working backwards to decide what type of character would possess it, for instance the character of Helix, started with the idea of a fighter whose arms were DNA strands, although the team initially did not know much else about him. Most fighters were designed to fill a gameplay need, although there are some exceptions where a design came first. An early concept for the game had the characters using external devices to punch their opponents; however, this was later dropped in favor of the characters extending their actual arms. Art director Masaaki Ishikawa said that the game's art style was largely influenced by Dragon Ball and Akira. Yabuki has stated that, as opposed to one single protagonist, all of the characters are the protagonists of the game.

Release
The game was announced at the Nintendo Switch Presentation on January 12, 2017, and was released worldwide on June 16, 2017. Prior to the game's release, a multiplayer demo known as the "Arms Global Testpunch" was made available for download on the Nintendo eShop, with players being able to test the online gameplay during twelve separate hour-long sessions.

Irregular post-release updates were released featuring new playable characters, stages, and arms. These free releases of additional content followed Splatoon update model, while the Testpunch demo was also available for use multiple times. The game received new characters and stages by way of downloadable content until December 2017, when Nintendo announced that they would no longer be adding new content to the game other than balance updates.

In May 2018, a limited-time demo of the game was released on the eShop. Unlike the Testpunch events, this demo only featured offline modes of single-player and local multiplayer with a limited selection of characters and Arms to choose from.

Reception

Arms has been compared to the boxing minigame from Wii Sports. Jack Sheperd of The Independent stated after playing it at a Switch hands-on event that it was one of the "most impressive" games on display. Edge compared Arms with other Nintendo titles and thought that "Arms is to the fighting game what Splatoon is to the online shooter or Mario Kart to the driving game".

The game received "generally favorable" reviews, according to review aggregator Metacritic. Brandon Graeber from IGN praised the game's complexity and addictive nature, but noted the game's lack of content at launch. Michael McWhertor from Polygon applauded the game's concept, which he described as creative, and that the game reminded him of the Punch-Out!! series, stating that Arms could become Nintendo's next big franchise. Kallie Plagge from GameSpot praised the character roster, but criticized the game's steep learning curve.

Multiple publications listed the game as one of the best of 2017. In Game Informers Reader's Choice Best of 2017 Awards, the game placed third for "Best Fighting Game". It was also nominated for the same category in IGN's Best of 2017 Awards. The game has seen a small, but dedicated esports scene across multiple regions.

Sales
Arms debuted at number two on the UK sales charts, behind Horizon Zero Dawn. It was number two in Australia, behind the same game. It sold 100,652 physical copies during its first week of release in Japan, and debuted at number one on the all-format sales charts. By September 30, 2018, the game had sold over 2.1 million copies worldwide. The 2022 CESA Games White Papers revealed that ARMS had sold 2.66 million units, as of December 2021.

Awards

Legacy
A graphic novel by Dark Horse Comics based on Arms was under production before it was reportedly cancelled in March 2021. Several elements of the game exist in the 2018 crossover fighting game Super Smash Bros. Ultimate, such as Spring Man appearing as a summonable Assist Trophy and several characters cameoing as collectable Spirits. In addition, a downloadable content pack featuring Min Min as a playable fighter, Spring Stadium as a stage, and 18 music tracks from the game was released on June 29, 2020. An Amiibo figure of Min Min was released on April 29, 2022.

Notes

References

External links
  (archived)

2017 video games
3D fighting games
Fighting games used at the Evolution Championship Series tournament
Multiplayer and single-player video games
Nintendo Entertainment Planning & Development games
Nintendo games
Nintendo Switch games
Nintendo Switch-only games
Nintendo franchises
Video games developed in Japan
Fighting games
Split-screen multiplayer games
Boxing video games